Mount Alifan is a peak on the U.S. island territory of Guam. It is located in Agat on the south-west of the island. Alifan is the highest point overseeing Agat Bay and was the site of fierce fighting during the 1944 U.S. invasion of Guam after four years of Japanese occupation. The War in the Pacific National Historical Park owns a "Mt. Alifan Unit" but it is undeveloped.

References

Mountains of Guam
Agat, Guam